Alison Sealy-Smith (born 1959) is a Barbados-born Canadian actress who is best known for her role as Storm in various Marvel animated TV series.

Early life and education 
Smith was born in Bridgetown, Barbados and raised in Toronto. She attended Mount Allison University in New Brunswick, Canada, where she studied psychology on a scholarship.

Career 
She is the founding director of Obsidian Theatre, a company that specializes in African-Canadian drama. Smith was awarded a Dora Mavor Moore Award for her 1997 star turn in Djanet Sears' Harlem Duet.

Her film and television credits have included the series Street Legal, This is Wonderland and The Line, and a recurring role in Kevin Hill. She also had a small role in the 1998 film My Date with the President's Daughter.

Smith also voiced characters in various animated series such as Storm on the 1990s X-Men and Scarlett on the Teletoon series Delilah and Julius. She played Sergeant Rose in the film Confessions of a Teenage Drama Queen, Honey (with Jessica Alba), Dark Water, and Talk to Me. Since the mid-2000s, she had a recurring role as Ms. Mann in the children's series Naturally, Sadie. In 2009, she performed as Nurse Lydia in the HBO Canada series Bloodletting & Miraculous Cures.

Smith won a Dora Mavor Moore Award in 1997 for Best Female Performance for her role in Harlem Duet. She also won a Dora Mavor Moore Award in 2009 for Outstanding Performance By A Female In A Principal Role with her role as Lena in A Raisin In The Sun.

Personal life 
Her daughter, Makyla Smith, is also an actress.

Filmography

Film

Television

References

External links
 
 https://web.archive.org/web/20091228082134/http://www.bloodletting.tv/nurse.html#/cast/alison-sealy-smith

1959 births
Living people
Barbadian emigrants to Canada
Black Canadian actresses
Canadian television actresses
Canadian voice actresses
20th-century Canadian actresses
21st-century Canadian actresses
Actresses from Toronto
Dora Mavor Moore Award winners
Canadian stage actresses
Mount Allison University alumni